The 3rd constituency of the Pyrénées-Orientales (French: Troisième circonscription des Pyrénées-Orientales) is a French legislative constituency in the Pyrénées-Orientales département. Like the other 576 French constituencies, it elects one MP using the two-round system, with a run-off if no candidate receives over 50% of the vote in the first round.

Description

The 3rd constituency of Pyrénées-Orientales stretches from Perpignan to the south western edge of the department.

The seat has broadly followed the national voting trends including the 2017 election when the voters elected the En Marche! candidate, however there was also a strong performance by the National Front who came second.

Assembly Members

Election results

2022

 
 
 
 
 
 
 
|-
| colspan="8" bgcolor="#E9E9E9"|
|-

2017

|- style="background-color:#E9E9E9;text-align:center;"
! colspan="2" rowspan="2" style="text-align:left;" | Candidate
! rowspan="2" colspan="2" style="text-align:left;" | Party
! colspan="2" | 1st round
! colspan="2" | 2nd round
|- style="background-color:#E9E9E9;text-align:center;"
! width="75" | Votes
! width="30" | %
! width="75" | Votes
! width="30" | %
|-
| style="background-color:" |
| style="text-align:left;" | Laurence Gayte
| style="text-align:left;" | La République En Marche!
| LREM
| 
| 22.70
| 
| 59.31
|-
| style="background-color:" |
| style="text-align:left;" | Sandrine Dogor
| style="text-align:left;" | National Front
| FN
| 
| 19.28
| 
| 40.69
|-
| style="background-color:" |
| style="text-align:left;" | Ségolène Neuville
| style="text-align:left;" | Socialist Party
| PS
| 
| 15.68
| colspan="2" style="text-align:left;" |
|-
| style="background-color:" |
| style="text-align:left;" | Philippe Assens
| style="text-align:left;" | La France Insoumise
| FI
| 
| 14.54
| colspan="2" style="text-align:left;" |
|-
| style="background-color:" |
| style="text-align:left;" | Danièle Pagès
| style="text-align:left;" | The Republicans
| LR
| 
| 13.17
| colspan="2" style="text-align:left;" |
|-
| style="background-color:" |
| style="text-align:left;" | Mireille Bossy
| style="text-align:left;" | Independent
| DIV
| 
| 4.44
| colspan="2" style="text-align:left;" |
|-
| style="background-color:" |
| style="text-align:left;" | Catherine Barrère
| style="text-align:left;" | Regionalist
| REG
| 
| 3.78
| colspan="2" style="text-align:left;" |
|-
| style="background-color:" |
| style="text-align:left;" | Léa Tyteca
| style="text-align:left;" | Communist Party
| PCF
| 
| 2.82
| colspan="2" style="text-align:left;" |
|-
| style="background-color:" |
| style="text-align:left;" | Roland Scaramozzino
| style="text-align:left;" | Ecologist
| ECO
| 
| 1.18
| colspan="2" style="text-align:left;" |
|-
| style="background-color:" |
| style="text-align:left;" | Patricia Roget
| style="text-align:left;" | Debout la France
| DLF
| 
| 1.04
| colspan="2" style="text-align:left;" |
|-
| style="background-color:" |
| style="text-align:left;" | Anna-Maria Urroz
| style="text-align:left;" | Far Left
| EXG
| 
| 0.70
| colspan="2" style="text-align:left;" |
|-
| style="background-color:" |
| style="text-align:left;" | Blandine Urbanski
| style="text-align:left;" | Independent
| DIV
| 
| 0.67
| colspan="2" style="text-align:left;" |
|-
| colspan="8" style="background-color:#E9E9E9;"|
|- style="font-weight:bold"
| colspan="4" style="text-align:left;" | Total
| 
| 100%
| 
| 100%
|-
| colspan="8" style="background-color:#E9E9E9;"|
|-
| colspan="4" style="text-align:left;" | Registered voters
| 
| style="background-color:#E9E9E9;"|
| 
| style="background-color:#E9E9E9;"|
|-
| colspan="4" style="text-align:left;" | Blank/Void ballots
| 
| 2.82%
| 
| 13.64%
|-
| colspan="4" style="text-align:left;" | Turnout
| 
| 49.29%
| 
| 43.50%
|-
| colspan="4" style="text-align:left;" | Abstentions
| 
| 50.71%
| 
| 56.50%
|-
| colspan="8" style="background-color:#E9E9E9;"|
|- style="font-weight:bold"
| colspan="6" style="text-align:left;" | Result
| colspan="2" style="background-color:" | REM GAIN FROM PS
|}

2012

|- style="background-color:#E9E9E9;text-align:center;"
! colspan="2" rowspan="2" style="text-align:left;" | Candidate
! rowspan="2" colspan="2" style="text-align:left;" | Party
! colspan="2" | 1st round
! colspan="2" | 2nd round
|- style="background-color:#E9E9E9;text-align:center;"
! width="75" | Votes
! width="30" | %
! width="75" | Votes
! width="30" | %
|-
| style="background-color:" |
| style="text-align:left;" | Ségolène Neuville
| style="text-align:left;" | Socialist Party
| PS
| 
| 37.65
| 
| 53.03
|-
| style="background-color:" |
| style="text-align:left;" | Jean Castex
| style="text-align:left;" | Union for a Popular Movement
| UMP
| 
| 30.52
| 
| 46.97
|-
| style="background-color:" |
| style="text-align:left;" | Bruno Lemaire
| style="text-align:left;" | National Front
| FN
| 
| 18.67
| colspan="2" style="text-align:left;" |
|-
| style="background-color:" |
| style="text-align:left;" | Daniel Borreill
| style="text-align:left;" | Left Front
| FG
| 
| 7.23
| colspan="2" style="text-align:left;" |
|-
| style="background-color:" |
| style="text-align:left;" | Jean-Marc Panis
| style="text-align:left;" | Europe Ecology – The Greens
| EELV
| 
| 2.84
| colspan="2" style="text-align:left;" |
|-
| style="background-color:" |
| style="text-align:left;" | Claude Sala
| style="text-align:left;" | Ecologist
| ECO
| 
| 0.86
| colspan="2" style="text-align:left;" |
|-
| style="background-color:" |
| style="text-align:left;" | Daniel Fabresse
| style="text-align:left;" | Far Left
| EXG
| 
| 0.67
| colspan="2" style="text-align:left;" |
|-
| style="background-color:" |
| style="text-align:left;" | Ahmed Sobban
| style="text-align:left;" | Miscellaneous Left
| DVG
| 
| 0.51
| colspan="2" style="text-align:left;" |
|-
| style="background-color:" |
| style="text-align:left;" | Christian Desrousseaux
| style="text-align:left;" | Ecologist
| ECO
| 
| 0.50
| colspan="2" style="text-align:left;" |
|-
| style="background-color:" |
| style="text-align:left;" | Anna-Maria Urpoz
| style="text-align:left;" | Far Left
| EXG
| 
| 0.38
| colspan="2" style="text-align:left;" |
|-
| style="background-color:" |
| style="text-align:left;" | Jean-Marie Rul
| style="text-align:left;" | Other
| AUT
| 
| 0.17
| colspan="2" style="text-align:left;" |
|-
| colspan="8" style="background-color:#E9E9E9;"|
|- style="font-weight:bold"
| colspan="4" style="text-align:left;" | Total
| 
| 100%
| 
| 100%
|-
| colspan="8" style="background-color:#E9E9E9;"|
|-
| colspan="4" style="text-align:left;" | Registered voters
| 
| style="background-color:#E9E9E9;"|
| 
| style="background-color:#E9E9E9;"|
|-
| colspan="4" style="text-align:left;" | Blank/Void ballots
| 
| 1.68%
| 
| 3.65%
|-
| colspan="4" style="text-align:left;" | Turnout
| 
| 61.32%
| 
| 62.19%
|-
| colspan="4" style="text-align:left;" | Abstentions
| 
| 38.68%
| 
| 37.81%
|-
| colspan="8" style="background-color:#E9E9E9;"|
|- style="font-weight:bold"
| colspan="6" style="text-align:left;" | Result
| colspan="2" style="background-color:" | PS GAIN FROM UMP
|}

2007

|- style="background-color:#E9E9E9;text-align:center;"
! colspan="2" rowspan="2" style="text-align:left;" | Candidate
! rowspan="2" colspan="2" style="text-align:left;" | Party
! colspan="2" | 1st round
! colspan="2" | 2nd round
|- style="background-color:#E9E9E9;text-align:center;"
! width="75" | Votes
! width="30" | %
! width="75" | Votes
! width="30" | %
|-
| style="background-color:" |
| style="text-align:left;" | François Calvet
| style="text-align:left;" | Union for a Popular Movement
| UMP
| 
| 42.84
| 
| 51.94
|-
| style="background-color:" |
| style="text-align:left;" | Christian Bourquin
| style="text-align:left;" | Socialist Party
| PS
| 
| 30.82
| 
| 48.06
|-
| style="background-color:" |
| style="text-align:left;" | Francoise Fiter
| style="text-align:left;" | Communist Party
| PCF
| 
| 5.06
| colspan="2" style="text-align:left;" |
|-
| style="background-color:" |
| style="text-align:left;" | Dominique Schemla
| style="text-align:left;" | UDF-Democratic Movement
| UDF-MoDem
| 
| 5.05
| colspan="2" style="text-align:left;" |
|-
| style="background-color:" |
| style="text-align:left;" | Francoise Bataillon
| style="text-align:left;" | National Front
| FN
| 
| 4.08
| colspan="2" style="text-align:left;" |
|-
| style="background-color:" |
| style="text-align:left;" | Claude Begue
| style="text-align:left;" | Far Left
| EXG
| 
| 3.22
| colspan="2" style="text-align:left;" |
|-
| style="background-color:" |
| style="text-align:left;" | Claude Sala
| style="text-align:left;" | Ecologist
| ECO
| 
| 1.76
| colspan="2" style="text-align:left;" |
|-
| style="background-color:" |
| style="text-align:left;" | Jacques Duverger
| style="text-align:left;" | Hunting, Fishing, Nature and Traditions
| CPNT
| 
| 1.21
| colspan="2" style="text-align:left;" |
|-
| style="background-color:" |
| style="text-align:left;" | Pierre Prat
| style="text-align:left;" | Independent
| DIV
| 
| 1.17
| colspan="2" style="text-align:left;" |
|-
| style="background-color:" |
| style="text-align:left;" | Christiane Dugelay
| style="text-align:left;" | Independent
| DIV
| 
| 1.11
| colspan="2" style="text-align:left;" |
|-
| style="background-color:" |
| style="text-align:left;" | Jordi Vera
| style="text-align:left;" | Regionalist
| REG
| 
| 1.08
| colspan="2" style="text-align:left;" |
|-
| style="background-color:" |
| style="text-align:left;" | Enric Vilanova Cortassa
| style="text-align:left;" | Regionalist
| REG
| 
| 1.05
| colspan="2" style="text-align:left;" |
|-
| style="background-color:" |
| style="text-align:left;" | Monique Reze
| style="text-align:left;" | Movement for France
| MPF
| 
| 0.90
| colspan="2" style="text-align:left;" |
|-
| style="background-color:" |
| style="text-align:left;" | Patrice Basso
| style="text-align:left;" | Far Left
| EXG
| 
| 0.65
| colspan="2" style="text-align:left;" |
|-
| style="background-color:" |
| style="text-align:left;" | Odile Thevenot
| style="text-align:left;" | Independent
| DIV
| 
| 0.00
| colspan="2" style="text-align:left;" |
|-
| colspan="8" style="background-color:#E9E9E9;"|
|- style="font-weight:bold"
| colspan="4" style="text-align:left;" | Total
| 
| 100%
| 
| 100%
|-
| colspan="8" style="background-color:#E9E9E9;"|
|-
| colspan="4" style="text-align:left;" | Registered voters
| 
| style="background-color:#E9E9E9;"|
| 
| style="background-color:#E9E9E9;"|
|-
| colspan="4" style="text-align:left;" | Blank/Void ballots
| 
| 2.14%
| 
| 4.63%
|-
| colspan="4" style="text-align:left;" | Turnout
| 
| 62.41%
| 
| 63.88%
|-
| colspan="4" style="text-align:left;" | Abstentions
| 
| 37.59%
| 
| 36.12%
|-
| colspan="8" style="background-color:#E9E9E9;"|
|- style="font-weight:bold"
| colspan="6" style="text-align:left;" | Result
| colspan="2" style="background-color:" | UMP HOLD
|}

2002

|- style="background-color:#E9E9E9;text-align:center;"
! colspan="2" rowspan="2" style="text-align:left;" | Candidate
! rowspan="2" colspan="2" style="text-align:left;" | Party
! colspan="2" | 1st round
! colspan="2" | 2nd round
|- style="background-color:#E9E9E9;text-align:center;"
! width="75" | Votes
! width="30" | %
! width="75" | Votes
! width="30" | %
|-
| style="background-color:" |
| style="text-align:left;" | François Calvet
| style="text-align:left;" | Union for a Presidential Majority
| UMP
| 
| 33.84
| 
| 51.52
|-
| style="background-color:" |
| style="text-align:left;" | Christian Bourquin
| style="text-align:left;" | Socialist Party
| PS
| 
| 31.10
| 
| 48.48
|-
| style="background-color:" |
| style="text-align:left;" | Annie Tutin
| style="text-align:left;" | National Front
| FN
| 
| 12.32
| colspan="2" style="text-align:left;" |
|-
| style="background-color:" |
| style="text-align:left;" | Françoise Fiter
| style="text-align:left;" | Communist Party
| PCF
| 
| 5.60
| colspan="2" style="text-align:left;" |
|-
| style="background-color:" |
| style="text-align:left;" | Christian Blanc
| style="text-align:left;" | Miscellaneous Right
| DVD
| 
| 4.08
| colspan="2" style="text-align:left;" |
|-
| style="background-color:" |
| style="text-align:left;" | Conception Gallego
| style="text-align:left;" | Hunting, Fishing, Nature and Traditions
| CPNT
| 
| 2.15
| colspan="2" style="text-align:left;" |
|-
| style="background-color:" |
| style="text-align:left;" | François Ferrand
| style="text-align:left;" | The Greens
| LV
| 
| 1.98
| colspan="2" style="text-align:left;" |
|-
| style="background-color:" |
| style="text-align:left;" | Bernard Cholet
| style="text-align:left;" | Revolutionary Communist League
| LCR
| 
| 1.71
| colspan="2" style="text-align:left;" |
|-
| style="background-color:" |
| style="text-align:left;" | Pierre Prat
| style="text-align:left;" | Independent
| DIV
| 
| 1.51
| colspan="2" style="text-align:left;" |
|-
| style="background-color:" |
| style="text-align:left;" | Jordi Vera
| style="text-align:left;" | Regionalist
| REG
| 
| 1.15
| colspan="2" style="text-align:left;" |
|-
| style="background-color:" |
| style="text-align:left;" | Irene Nuccio
| style="text-align:left;" | Independent
| DIV
| 
| 1.09
| colspan="2" style="text-align:left;" |
|-
| style="background-color:" |
| style="text-align:left;" | Simon Sales
| style="text-align:left;" | Republican Pole
| PR
| 
| 0.89
| colspan="2" style="text-align:left;" |
|-
| style="background-color:" |
| style="text-align:left;" | Christian Pourriere
| style="text-align:left;" | Independent
| DIV
| 
| 0.71
| colspan="2" style="text-align:left;" |
|-
| style="background-color:" |
| style="text-align:left;" | Esther Silan
| style="text-align:left;" | Workers' Struggle
| LO
| 
| 0.68
| colspan="2" style="text-align:left;" |
|-
| style="background-color:" |
| style="text-align:left;" | Françoise Marin
| style="text-align:left;" | National Republican Movement
| MNR
| 
| 0.59
| colspan="2" style="text-align:left;" |
|-
| style="background-color:" |
| style="text-align:left;" | Maryse Lapergue
| style="text-align:left;" | Ecologist
| ECO
| 
| 0.34
| colspan="2" style="text-align:left;" |
|-
| style="background-color:" |
| style="text-align:left;" | Denis Bellac
| style="text-align:left;" | Miscellaneous Right
| DVD
| 
| 0.26
| colspan="2" style="text-align:left;" |
|-
| colspan="8" style="background-color:#E9E9E9;"|
|- style="font-weight:bold"
| colspan="4" style="text-align:left;" | Total
| 
| 100%
| 
| 100%
|-
| colspan="8" style="background-color:#E9E9E9;"|
|-
| colspan="4" style="text-align:left;" | Registered voters
| 
| style="background-color:#E9E9E9;"|
| 
| style="background-color:#E9E9E9;"|
|-
| colspan="4" style="text-align:left;" | Blank/Void ballots
| 
| 2.30%
| 
| 5.08%
|-
| colspan="4" style="text-align:left;" | Turnout
| 
| 65.80%
| 
| 65.53%
|-
| colspan="4" style="text-align:left;" | Abstentions
| 
| 34.20%
| 
| 34.47%
|-
| colspan="8" style="background-color:#E9E9E9;"|
|- style="font-weight:bold"
| colspan="6" style="text-align:left;" | Result
| colspan="2" style="background-color:" | UMP GAIN FROM PS
|}

References

3